Lucas Gabriel Modesto (born 9 November 1996) is an Argentine professional footballer who plays as a midfielder.

Career
Modesto, after signing from Tigre, started his senior career with Atlanta. He made his professional debut in a 3–1 home victory over Justo José de Urquiza on 17 November, which was followed by the midfielder scoring his first goal in his second appearance against All Boys four days later at the Estadio Islas Malvinas.

Career statistics
.

References

External links

1996 births
Living people
Place of birth missing (living people)
Argentine footballers
Association football midfielders
Primera B Metropolitana players
Club Atlético Atlanta footballers
Deportivo Armenio footballers